Wanda Rothgardt (12 March 1905 – 16 June 1950) was a Swedish stage and film actress. Rothgardt was the daughter of the actress Edla Rothgardt. She married the actor Semmy Friedmann with whom she had a daughter Jane Friedmann who also became an actress.

After making her debut as a child actor, she appeared in twenty films. Her final film was Eva (1948).

Filmography

References

Bibliography
 Soila, Tytti. The Cinema of Scandinavia. Wallflower Press, 2005.

Further reading

External links

1905 births
1950 deaths
Swedish stage actresses
Swedish film actresses
Swedish silent film actresses
20th-century Swedish actresses
Actresses from Stockholm